Amir-Abbas Fakhravar, research fellow and visiting lecturer at the Center for the Study of Culture and Security at The Institute of World Politics, is an Iranian dissident. Fakhravar served as the Secretary General of the Confederation of Iranian Students and President of the "Iranian Freedom Institute" in Washington, D.C.

Currently, Fakhravar is the Senate Chairman of National Iranian Congress (NIC) an organization opposing the Islamic Republic regime in Iran.

Life in Iran

Activities 
According to his own account, Fakhravar was a student leader during Iran student protests, July 1999. Several Iranian former student activists have said they had never heard of him.

Imprisonment
An Amnesty International press release published in 2004, designates Fakhravar as a prisoner of conscience who was sentenced to eight years of imprisonment for defamation charges in November 2002, because of comments he made on Iranian authorities in his book, This Place is Not a Ditch. The statement further adds sometime between January and February 2004, he was held at Ward 325, where he was reportedly subject to solitary confinement and white torture, before being granted a 2-days furlough on or around 8 February 2004. According to the same release, he was moved to Qasr prison upon his return and on or around 21 March, he was given another leave lasting 19 days for the new year holidays, as part of an annual temporary release of prisoners.

On 17 July 2005, Eli Lake made an interview with Fakhravar while on temporarily release to participate in his university exams, in which he said "I forgot to report back to prison" and that he was going to ignore his arrest warrant. In October 2005, RFE/RL reported that Fakhravar has been on furlough since June of the same year, and has told them about his decision to refuse returning to prison and his sister of being informed at the court that government forces are authorized to shoot him on sight.

Various Iranian activists have contested allegations of Fakhravar and his credentials as a political prisoner.

Fleeing Iran 
Fakhravar took a commercial flight to Dubai, United Arab Emirates.
A WikiLeaks cable from the American Consul writes that Fakhravar left Iran "while on prison leave" and "with the help of 'friends' who bribed [Iranian] airport officials not to enter his name into the computer".

Activities in the United States
Upon his arrival, Fakhravar was invited as a guest of honor at an American Enterprise Institute (AEI) lunch, co-hosted by Richard Perle and Michael Ledeen; and was given an office space by the Foundation for Defense of Democracies (FDD). He called for a unified opposition to the Iranian government, in order to bring regime change in Iran. 

He met American officials from the Pentagon to the State Department, as well as with Vice President Dick Cheney and President George W. Bush. 

Fakhravar founded 'Iran Enterprise Institute' (IEI), which took its name as well as some of its funding from the AEI. According to a source talking to The American Prospect, in 2006 he applied for U.S. government funds appropriated by Iran Freedom and Support Act for three projects totaling $3 million, but it is unclear how much money, if any was received. 

In 2013, he established a 'National Iran Congress' (NIC), and drafted a constitution modeled after constitution of western countries for future Iran.

Testifies at congressional hearings 
On July 20, 2006, Fakhravar testified at U.S. Senate Committee on Homeland Security and Governmental Affairs representing Independent student movement, where he called the Iranian reform movement a "dead end" and advocated regime change.

2012 trip to Israel
Israeli foreign ministry refused to grant Fakhravar a visa in 2011, following an invitation by an Israeli institute. Yossi Melman of Haaretz reported that his denial was a result of efforts made by Richard Horowitz, a New York attorney and former IDF officer who brought concerns about his credibility and motivations to Israeli officials.

In late January/early February, Amir Abbas Fakhravar and CIS team visited Israel where they spoke with members of parliament and Israeli opinion makers. January 28, 2012, Ynetnews an Israeli newspaper wrote Tzipi Livni meets Amir Abbas Fakhravar, Iranian opposition member. Jerusalem Post wrote Livni's statement came during a meeting she and Kadima MK Nachman Shai held with Amir Abbas Fakhravar and Saghar Erica Kasraie of the Confederation of Iranian Students in Tel Aviv. January 28, 2012, Ynetnews an Israeli newspaper wrote Tzipi Livni meets Amir Abbas Fakhravar, Iranian opposition member. Fakhravar had an interview with Jerusalem Post and said "Attack will bring ayatollahs, allies, public legitimacy." Fakhravar was speaker on a panel discussion at the 12th Annual Herzliya Conference "Iran: Will Sanctions Work?" During the trip, Fakhravar also visited the Israeli Knesset on January 31, 2012, to meet with MK Shai Hermesh (Kadima). The trip had been noted in several articles in the Jerusalem Post and other national Israeli Media. Channel 2 TV- Jerusalem – Amir Fakhravar's Interview with Ulpan ShiShi on prime-time news. Several campaigns were started on Facebook and Social media after this interview with the direct message of this interview: We (the Iranians) Love Israel. Israelis Love Iranian, Iranian Loves Israel.

Election boycotts
In the 2005 Iranian presidential elections, he supported boycotting the elections in Iran, claiming that the regime has no legitimacy and that the presidential elections should be turned into a referendum. Fakhravar strongly opposed president Mahmoud Ahmadinejad's attempts of a "second cultural revolution," such as appointing hardliner clerics such as Amid Zanjani, famous for his work as a religious prosecutor, as chancellor of Tehran University.

Political leaning and views
Fakhravar's views has been described as neoconservative.

He is a proponent of regime change policy and support for military action against Iran. According to Connie Bruck of The New Yorker, his political stance has been praised by Sheldon Adelson.

In an interview with Ynet, Fakhravar said that if the West launches a military attack on Iran, "The top brass will flee immediately. People will come out onto the streets protesting, why are we being bombed? Many of the regime' mid-level officials will shave their beards, don ties and join the (civilians) on the streets."

Publications 
Fakhravar has written for two Iranian pro-reform newspapers, namely Khordad and Mosharekat.

He has authored the following books: 
 The Greenest Eyes on Earth (1998)
 This Place is not a Ditch (2000)
 Still, the Scraps of Prison (2005)

Reception 
Fakhravar says his This Place is not a Ditch was finalist for the 2001-2002 version of 'Paulo Coelho Literary Prize'. Journalist Laura Rozen states that existence of such award has been questioned.

English PEN bestowed him honorary membership in March 2004, and he was recognized on Day of the Imprisoned Writer on 15 November 2004 by Writers in Prison Committee of International PEN.

Fakhravar wrote in his book Comrade Ayatollah that Supreme Leader of Iran Ali Khamenei is a Soviet agent trained by KGB. He told Asharq Al-Awsat that the book includes hundreds of documents, adding "I obtained the documents from the KJB [sic] archive, as well as the CIA and Israeli Mossad and even the Iranian intelligence itself. I did not use a single Iranian opposition document". Belén Fernández describes the book as a successful appeal to attract attention of Trump administration officials and like-minded media like Fox News.

Personal life 
Fakhravar identifies as an ex-Muslim.

Documentaries
 "The Case for War:In Defense of Freedom" in 2007, Amir Abbas Fakhravar participated Richard Perle presented this documentary articulating his view of the challenges facing the U.S. post 9/11, and debating with his critics including Richard Holbrooke, Simon Jenkins, and Abdel Bari Atwan. The film was broadcast by PBS in their series America at a Crossroads.
 Forbidden Iran in 2004, Fakhravar's story and his organization was one of the main parts of this documentary about Iranian Student Movement and July 9, 1999.

References

External links

 Amir-Abbas Fakhravar, IMDb
 Fakhravar.com – Official website
  (امیرعباس فخر آور (سیاوش – Official blog
 Amir-Abbas Fakhravar
 Amir-Abbas Fakhravar's Arrest Case

Living people
1975 births
People from Tehran
Iranian writers
Iranian dissidents
Iranian conspiracy theorists
Iranian refugees
Iranian prisoners and detainees
Amnesty International prisoners of conscience held by Iran
Iranian emigrants to the United States
People with acquired American citizenship
Iranian former Muslims